Kostas Giannoulis (born 9 December 1987) is a Greek professional footballer who plays as a left-back for Super League club OFI.

Club career

Panionios
He started his professional career in 2005 with Panionios, but he failed to make a single appearance for the club, and he was loaned to Fostiras and Pierikos. He made 25 appearances for Pierikos in their successful Gamma Ethniki campaign, where they won the title and promotion to Beta Ethniki.

Iraklis
In summer 2007, he signed for Iraklis, where he was established as a starting left-back by his then-coach, Ángel Pedraza. He made a total of 55 appearances in the Greek Superleague for the team.

Köln
In May 2010, he signed for Bundesliga side 1. FC Köln. Köln have been quick to indicate their contentment with this deal. "We are very glad to have signed Konstantinos Giannoulis, who will be a gain for the defence," said general manager Michael Meier to the club's official website. "He fits exactly our left back requirements for the coming season." Kicker reports that because of Iraklis ongoing financial difficulties, Köln have been able to swoop for the defender by tabling a "low six-figure fee". They were not the only German outfit interested in the full-back, as Kaiserslautern had already made concrete steps towards securing the Greek's signature. After half a season however, having never played for the first team, he was told that he could leave the club for free.

Atromitos
On 23 June 2011, he agreed to sign a season-long loan deal with Greek Superleague side Atromitos, where he made 25 appearances and scored 1 goal. On 7 August 2012, Giannoulis was officially released by 1. FC Köln and subsequently signed a three-year contract with Atromitos.

On 28 June 2014, the 27 years old defender signed an extension of his contract (which ended at 2015) for another two years in presence of the Technical Director Mr. Giannis Aggelopoulos. He is the seventh football player that in a period less of a year that renews his contract with our team after Tasos Karamanos, Luigi Cennamo, Nikolaos Lazaridis, Efstathios Tavlaridis, Luiz Eduardo Santana Brito and Miguel Sebastián Garcia. 
Kostas Giannoulis a football player with ethics, quality and inexhaustible source of strength had the last season (2013/14) 44 appearances in all the organizations.

Olympiacos
On 31 August 2014, it was announced that Kostas Giannoulis has joined Olympiacos. Giannoulis commented the following at atromitosfc.gr : "A great thank is nothing in front what I owe to Atromitos. After a bad year in Germany, Atromitos brought me in Greece and gave me the chance to participate in a high level and to show the talents that I have by playing at least only once in the National Team and now to achieve a transfer at the top club of the country."

On 9 July 2015, he terminated his contract with the club.

Asteras Tripolis
On 15 July 2015, it was announced that Kostas Giannoulis had joined Asteras Tripolis on a two-year contract for an undisclosed fee.

Pafos
On 13 August 2018, Giannoulis signed a two years contract with Cypriot club Pafos FC for an undisclosed fee. On 5 September 2018, after his first game with the club he solved his contract due to personal reasons.

OFI
On 28 December 2018, it was announced that Kostas Giannoulis had joined OFI on a two-and-a-half years contract for an undisclosed fee.

International career
He made his international debut for Greece on 15 November 2011, in a friendly match against Romania.

Personal life
Giannoulis' younger brother, Dimitrios, is also a professional footballer.

Club statistics
Updated 31 May 2021

Honours
Pierikos
Gamma Ethniki: 2006–07

Atromitos
Greek Cup runner-up: 2011–12

Olympiacos
Super League Greece: 2014–15
Greek Cup: 2014–15

References

External links
 
 footballstats
 sport.gr 

1987 births
Living people
Greek footballers
Fostiras F.C. players
Panionios F.C. players
Iraklis Thessaloniki F.C. players
Pierikos F.C. players
1. FC Köln players
Atromitos F.C. players
Olympiacos F.C. players
Asteras Tripolis F.C. players
Pafos FC players
OFI Crete F.C. players
Super League Greece players
Delta Ethniki players
Gamma Ethniki players
Bundesliga players
Cypriot First Division players
Greek expatriate footballers
Expatriate footballers in Germany
Greek expatriate sportspeople in Germany
Footballers from Katerini
Greece international footballers
Association football fullbacks